Šimon Šumbera (born 5 January 1991) is a professional Czech football player currently playing for SK Líšeň.

References

External links

 Šimon Šumbera at Zbrojovka Brno website

Czech footballers
1991 births
Living people
Czech First League players
Czech National Football League players
Slovak Super Liga players
FC Fastav Zlín players
FC Zbrojovka Brno players
1. SC Znojmo players
FK Fotbal Třinec players
FK Senica players
SK Líšeň players
Expatriate footballers in Slovakia
Association football midfielders
Sportspeople from Zlín